Tempura Kidz (stylized as TEMPURA KIDZ) was a Japanese pop dance and vocals group formed by four girls and one boy managed by Asobi System and signed with the Sony Music Japan label. They started their career as back-up dancers for Kyary Pamyu Pamyu, and have toured with her since late 2011. Their songs are produced by Ram Rider.  The group debuted on November 13, 2012 with the music video for their first song "Cider Cider", which was produced by Ram Rider. In January 2013, they released their first digital single "Strobe", used as ending theme song for the anime Chō Soku Henkei Gyrozetter. Two months later, on March 6, Tempura Kidz made their physical debut with the release of their first single "One Step" produced by Nishi-ken. On March 26, 2018, member Nanaho graduated from Tempura Kidz. Tempura Kidz continued to perform as a four-person group until the graduation of Yu-ka, P→★ and Ao in March 2021.

The group is supervised by Maiko, a dancer and choreographer for Kyary Pamyu Pamyu.

Members 
 Karin (KARIN), born September 2, 1998 (age 23)

Former Members 
Nanaho (NaNaHo), born  — Nanaho graduated from Tempura Kidz on March 26, 2018
 Yu-ka (YU-KA), born  —  former leader of the group
 Ao (AO), born  — former member of J Dee'Z and Misia's backing dancer
P→★ (P-chan), born  — the only boy among members

Discography

Singles

Albums

Music videos 

 [A] As a dance group named .
 [B] As backing dancers.
 [C] Only P→★ as backing dancer.
 [D] Only Ao as japanese teacher.
 [E] Special participation.

References

External links 
 
 
 
 Tempura Kidz' official blog

Japanese dance groups
Japanese pop music groups
Child musical groups
Sony Music Entertainment Japan artists
Musical groups from Tokyo
Musical groups established in 2012
2012 establishments in Japan